Le Phonographique (often called the Phono, and later renamed to Bar Phono) was a gothic nightclub located underneath the Merrion Centre in Leeds. Founded under the name the WigWam club, the venue's 1979 rebranding led to it becoming a location frequented by members of both the local post-punk and New Romantic scenes. Here, the two scenes collided and created the earliest phase of the goth subculture. It was the first goth club in the world, opening in 1979 and eventually closing in 2005. Disc jockeys at the club, such as Marc Almond (a member of Soft Cell), DJ Mark M (previously of Tiffany's), Anni Hogan (a member of Marc and the Mambas) and Claire Shearsby (previously of the F Club), would play gothic rock and dark wave music. In 1985, the Clash played an impromptu gig at the venue while attending.

Closure and legacy
The club was foundational to the emergence of the goth subculture by helping it differentiate itself from the conventions of punk.

There was a rivalry between it and the Bassment, another goth club that opened around the corner in the Merrion Centre a few years later.

The Sisters of Mercy song Floorshow was inspired by dances that were commonplace at the club. In an article for Dazed, it was stated that the "two steps forward, two steps back" style of dancing originated at the club, due to the pillar in the centre of its dancefloor.

The club closed in 2005, claiming "redevelopment". The site is now a retail storage unit.

References

Goth subculture
Goth venues
Dark wave
Music venues completed in 1979
Music venues in Leeds
1979 establishments in England
Nightclubs in England
Club nights